An oar is a tool used for rowing a boat.

OAR or oar may also refer to:

Places
Oar, a village in Vetiș Commune, Satu Mare County, Romania

Acronyms
Offender Aid and Restoration
Office of Oceanic and Atmospheric Research
Olympic Athlete from Russia, formal designation of athletes from Russia who were allowed to compete at the 2018 Winter Olympics
Operation Atlantic Resolve
Order of Augustinian Recollects, a religious order in the Roman Catholic Church founded in 1589
Oregon Administrative Rules, rules and regulations having the force of law in Oregon, United States
Original aspect ratio
Marina Municipal Airport, IATA code OAR
OAR, a jobs and resources management system for high-performance computing platforms
.oar, Open ARchive file used for terrain backup in OpenSimulator virtual environments

Music
O.A.R. or Of a Revolution, a band from Rockville, Maryland, United States
Oar (album), by Skip Spence
, a song by P-Model from the album Karkador

Other uses
Tommy Oar, an Australian association football (soccer) player
Oar (moth), a synonym of the moth genus Scopula

See also 
Ore (disambiguation)
Or (disambiguation)